Giuseppina Huguet (1871–1951) was a Catalan operatic soprano with a lyrical voice who sang throughout Europe prior to World War I.

Huguet was born in 1871 and registered on official documents as "Josefina" Huguet. Her first music teacher was Francisco Bonet in Barcelona, where she soon made her operatic debut as Lakmé at the Teatro Liceu of Barcelona. She subsequently toured several countries, including some South American nations. She performed, too, with success in Italy, appearing for the first time at Milan's La Scala in 1896, where she sang the role of Ophélie in Ambroise Thomas's Hamlet. Huguet proved popular in Russia as well.

Although Huguet often sang coloratura parts, such as Rosina in Rossini's Il Barbiere di Siviglia, she also undertook the verismo roles of Mimì in Puccini's La Bohème and Cio-Cio-San in Puccini's Madama Butterfly, and her recordings even include excerpts from Wagner's Lohengrin (on which she is accompanied by the famous tenor Fernando De Lucia). Indeed, her complete repertoire contained a wide range of roles: from The Queen of Night in Mozart's The Magic Flute to Nedda in Leoncavallo's Pagliacci.

Huguet's career as a recording artist was not particularly extensive. Her discography consists mainly of arias and ensemble pieces from opera that were recorded by the Gramophone Company,  forerunner of EMI. She also sang the role of Nedda in the first complete recording of Pagliacci in 1907 (with the Orchestra and Chorus of the Teatro alla Scala di Milano, Carlo Sabajno conducting). Volume One of The Record of Singing by Michael Scott (Duckworth, London, 1977) contains a synopsis of her career and an appraisal of her records, some of which are available on CD transfers.

External links 
 
Huguet's discography can be searched at the National Library of Catalonia 

1871 births
1951 deaths
Opera singers from Catalonia
Spanish operatic sopranos
19th-century Spanish women opera singers
20th-century Spanish women opera singers
Singers from Barcelona